The Potez 50 or Potez 50 A2 was a French two seat military multi-rôle aircraft, first flown in 1931. It did not go into service but seven variants using five different engines were produced, one of them setting several speed with useful load records and another, the Potez 506, setting three altitude world records.

Design

The Potez 50 was a single bay sesquiplane.  Both upper and lower wings were in two parts and were unswept with constant chord, though the trailing edge of the upper wing tapered outboard into rounded tips. The lower wing had a smaller chord as well as being about one third shorter. Both were built around two spruce and plywood box spars and were fabric covered.  The outward leaning pairs of interplane struts were closer on the lower wing as its spars were closer together; additional wire bracing completed the structure. The upper wing was braced over the fuselage on parallel pairs of outward and slightly backward leaning cabane struts to the upper fuselage; the lower wings were attached to the fuselage.  The wings lacked dihedral and were mounted with marked stagger; only the upper wing carried ailerons, which occupied about half the span.

The Potez 50 and its variants were powered by five different nose-mounted engines, two inlines and three radials, detailed below. The first of these was a  Lorraine 12Fd Courlis water-cooled W-12 engine, enclosed by a close fitting metal cowling which followed the contours of its three-cylinder banks. There was a large, rectangular, honeycomb radiator on the fuselage underside at the rear of the engine, equipped with a shutter. Behind the engine the fuselage was built around four longerons making it flat sided though with rounded ply decking; the central part of the fuselage around the cockpits was also ply skinned, with fabric aft. The pilot's open cockpit was under an angular cut-out in the upper trailing edge which widened his field of view; he controlled a fixed, forward firing machine gun and the gunner/observer's position close behind had a pair of machine guns on a flexible mount as well as radio and photographic equipment.

At the rear the empennage was conventional, with a cropped triangular tailplane mounted on top of the fuselage and braced from below on each side by an inverted V-strut, allowing its incidence to be varied in flight. Its elevators were separate and balanced. The Potez 50 had an almost triangular fin and a rounded, unbalanced rudder which reached to the keel.

The undercarriage was fixed with the mainwheels under aircraft fairings and on split axles centrally mounted on a transverse V-strut from the central lower fuselage. Short, faired legs with rubber shock absorbers and drag struts were attached to the outer lower fuselage. The steerable tailskid also had a rubber damper.

Operational history

The date of the first flight of the Potexz 50 is not known but it had already been tested by the end of June 1931 as it was selected, along with three other prototypes, to make a publicity tour of eastern Europe which began on 5 July. In October, still Courlis powered, it was at the government testing field at Villacoublay, but in December it was back at the Potez base at Meaulte with an unspecified  Hispano-Suiza engine. By March another engine change had been made, this time to the Salmson 18AB, an eighteen-cylinder air-cooled radial producing the same power as the Hispano.

Two Potez 50s were flying by the summer of 1932, one with an Hispano engine and the other with another radial, a supercharged, fourteen cylinder,  Gnome-Rhône Mistral Major. They both contested the Circuit des Alpes, with the Hispano powered aircraft officially entered and placed second, under two minutes behind the winner and the second, unofficial entrant  six minutes behind. In December it was on display at the 1932 Paris Aero Show, identified as the Potez 503.

In March 1933 Lemoine set further French and world load carrying speed records, some at least in a Potez 505 14Kbrs powered variant.

During May 1935 Détré demonstrated the Potez 501 with a  Hispano-Suiza 14AA (Type 79) fourteen cylinder radial engine.

The pre-war French civil aircraft register records three Potez 50s, one a 501 and the other two 502s.  One of the latter was converted into the 503.

Variants
 Potez 50 military prototype as described, initially with Lorraine 12Fd Courlis engine.
 Potez 501  Gnome-Rhône 14Kbrs Mistral Major. It later had a  Hispano-Suiza 14AA two-row radial. 
 Potez 502 two built.
 Potez 503 Gnome-Rhône 14K. Set 1932 speed with load records, displayed at 1932 Paris Salon. one converted from 502.
 Potex 504 
 Potez 505 Gnome-Rhône 14Kbrs Mistral Major.
 Potez 506  Gnome-Rhône 14Kdrs Mistral Major with higher compression and improved supercharger, driving a three blade propeller.  Set three world altitude records.

Specifications (Potez 50, Courlis engine)

References

1930s French military reconnaissance aircraft
050
Sesquiplanes
Aircraft first flown in 1931